Puteri Indonesia 2015, the 19th Puteri Indonesia pageant, held on February 20, 2015 at Plenary Hall, Jakarta Convention Center, Jakarta, Indonesia. Elvira Devinamira, Puteri Indonesia 2014 of East Java crowned her successor Anindya Kusuma Putri of Central Java at the end of the event.

Thirty Seven contestants from 33 Provinces competed for the crown. The winner will represent Indonesia at the Miss Universe 2015, while the runners-up will compete at the Miss International 2015 and Miss Supranational 2015 pageants.

Paulina Vega, Miss Universe 2014 of Colombia attend at the Grand Final Show. The event was broadcast live on Indonesian television network, Indosiar.

Results

Main
The Crowns of Puteri Indonesia Title Holders
 Puteri Indonesia 2015 (Miss Universe Indonesia 2015) 
 Puteri Indonesia Lingkungan 2015 (Miss International Indonesia 2015)
 Puteri Indonesia Pariwisata 2015 (Miss Supranational Indonesia 2015)

Contestants
37 Contestants have been confirmed. The information from Puteri Indonesia Official website.

Withdraws
 Gorontalo: Due to health issues Abharina Putri confirmed to withdraw in 2015 edition.

References

External links 

 Official Puteri Indonesia Official Website
 Official Miss Universe Official Website
 Miss International Official Website
 Official Miss Supranational Official Website

2015
Puteri Indonesia